Herbs and Apples is a 1925 novel by Helen Hooven Santmyer.  Her first novel, it was largely autobiographical.  Set in the fictional town of Tecumseh, Ohio, an unnamed Boston-area women's college, and Manhattan, it tells the story of Derrick Thornton, an aspiring female writer and poet, who ends up preferring the "herbs and apples" of Tecumseh to any sort of literary life.

The novel received a minor reception at the time, but otherwise made no impact.  It was rediscovered when Santmyer became a literary sensation in 1984, and reissued in hardcover (Harper & Row, 1985) and paperback (St. Martin's Press, 1987), with an introduction and three poems by Santmyer.

Plot
The story is told in the first person by Sue, who had met the young Derrick once, and then meets her a second time on the train taking them to the same college. At college, the two girls form a clique dedicated to literature and philosophy with four other freshmen, Alice, Edith, Madeleine, and Frances.  Derrick is easily the most ambitious and talented of them, writing poetry. She argues forcefully that marriage is an abdication of artistic talent, and vows never to get married.

During the summer between their freshman and sophomore years, World War I breaks out, and the United States enters the war a few months before they graduate.  Derrick, Sue, and Alice move to Manhattan, where Derrick finds a secretarial job working for a literary magazine. She continues to write poetry, and most of one play. On home visits, she argues with her childhood friend, Jack Devlin, whose support of pacifism angers her.  To her shock and fear, he enlists, and she agrees to consider marriage on his return. Jack is killed in action, and Derrick takes it very hard.

Shortly afterwards, Derrick's mother becomes deathly ill, and Derrick moves back to Tecumseh, destroying her drafts. As the oldest child of six, she finds herself replacing her mother in her siblings' lives. She accepts a teaching job at an elementary school. Sue later visits, and barely recognizes Derrick, who is serene and happy with her lot.

Reception

Notes

Bibliography

Early book reviews

Later book reviews
 
 

1925 American novels
Novels by Helen Hooven Santmyer
Novels set in Manhattan
Novels set in Ohio
Novels about writers
American bildungsromans
Novels set during World War I
English-language novels
1925 debut novels